Cannabis in Montenegro is illegal. The country serves as a conduit for Albanian cannabis being transported to Western Europe.

References

Further reading
 

Montenegro
Drugs in Montenegro